Cachapoal River is tributary river of the Rapel River in Chile located in the Libertador General Bernardo O'Higgins Region. The river gives its name to the Cachapoal Province.

Cachapoal Valley
The valley takes its name from the Cachapoal River that flows through Rapel Valley along with its tributaries, the Claro and Cortaderal rivers. All these watercourses flow into Rapel Lake.
 
Cachapoal River begun to incise in the rising Andes in the Miocene epoch. Later, as glaciers developed in the Andes the upper part of the valley was glaciated and reshaped into a glacial valley.

The climate of the valley is temperate and consistently Mediterranean, sheltered by the coastal range from the cooling influences of the Pacific Ocean.

Wine
The northern half of the great Rapel Valley has traditionally been known for its red wines, particularly Carménère, Cabernet Sauvignon, and Merlot. These account for approximately 80% of the region's total production. The valley features diverse microclimates which support production for a wide array of grapes; these range from cold-climate varieties at higher altitudes near the Andes, to varieties which need warmer climates in the areas surrounding Lake Rapel along the coastal hills.

References

Sources 
 Cuenca del río Rapel

Rivers of O'Higgins Region
Rivers of Chile